Nikita Dmitriyevich Soshnikov (born 14 October 1993) is a Russian professional ice hockey forward for Traktor Chelyabinsk of the Kontinental Hockey League (KHL).

Playing career

Atlant Moscow Oblast 
After playing youth hockey with Sputnik Nizhny Tagil, Soshnikov was chosen in the sixth round, 123rd overall of the 2010 KHL Draft by Atlant Moscow Oblast. He made his professional debut with the MHL affiliate of Atlant Moscow Oblast during the 2010–11 season. Soshnikov made his Kontinental Hockey League (KHL) debut playing with Atlant Moscow Oblast during the 2013–14 KHL season. Soshnikov played two seasons with Atlant, scoring two goals and five points in 37 games in his rookie campaign before continuing his development with 14 goals and 18 assists in the 2014–15 season.

Toronto Maple Leafs 
Upon completion of his second season in the KHL, on 20 March 2015, Soshnikov decided to move to North America to play in the NHL, signing as an undrafted free agent to a three-year, entry-level contract with the Toronto Maple Leafs.

Soshnikov made his NHL debut on 29 February 2016 against the Tampa Bay Lightning. He scored his first NHL goal on 2 March 2016 against Philipp Grubauer of the Washington Capitals.

Soshnikov started the 2017–18 season with the Toronto Marlies; however, there was a clause in Soshnikov's contract that stipulated he must be called up to the Leafs by 14 November 2017, or else he would be allowed to head to the KHL. He was called up just before the clause kicked in. In addition to this, he is now no longer waiver-exempt, meaning he would have to clear through waivers if he were to be sent back down to the AHL However, a logjam of players meant Soshnikov saw limited action. On 1 February 2018, Soshnikov was assigned to the Marlies for a conditioning stint. On 12 February 2018, it was announced that Soshnikov would be recalled from the Marlies, but would remain on the injured reserve.

St. Louis Blues 
Still passed on the depth chart, rumors began to circulate throughout February that Soshnikov was likely to be traded. On 15 February 2018, it was announced that Soshnikov had been traded to the St. Louis Blues for a fourth-round pick in the 2019 NHL Entry Draft.

Return to Russia 
As an impending restricted free agent from the Blues and unable to cement a role within the NHL team following an injury plagued 2018–19 season, Soshnikov opted to return to Russia to hone his game in the KHL. On 3 June 2019, his rights were traded from SKA Saint Petersburg to Salavat Yulaev Ufa in exchange for the rights to Vladimir Tkachev. He immediately agreed to a two-year contract with the club.

During his final year under contract with Salavat Yulaev Ufa in the 2020–21 season, Soshnikov registered 17 points through 21 regular season games before he was traded to HC CSKA Moscow in exchange for Mikhail Naumenkov on 28 November 2020.

New York Islanders 
Following three seasons in the KHL, Soshnikov opted to return for another shot at the NHL in the 2022–23 season, in agreeing to a one-year, $750,000 contract with the New York Islanders on 22 September 2022. Remaining on the Islanders roster to open the season, Soshnikov primarily served as a healthy scratch and featured in just three games before he was placed on waivers and re-assigned to AHL affiliate, the Bridgeport Islanders. After four games in the AHL, on 19 December, Soshnikov cleared unconditional waivers, resulting in the mutual termination of his contract with the Islanders.

Traktor Chelyabinsk 
On 20 December 2022, as a free agent, Soshnikov signed a two-year contract through the 2023–24 season in a return to the KHL with Traktor Chelyabinsk.

Career statistics

Regular season and playoffs

International

References

External links
 

1993 births
Living people
Atlant Moscow Oblast players
Avangard Omsk players
Bridgeport Islanders players
Buran Voronezh players
HC CSKA Moscow players
New York Islanders players
People from Nizhny Tagil
Russian ice hockey right wingers
St. Louis Blues players
Salavat Yulaev Ufa players
San Antonio Rampage players
Sportspeople from Sverdlovsk Oblast
Toronto Maple Leafs players
Toronto Marlies players
Traktor Chelyabinsk players
Undrafted National Hockey League players